Johann Balthasar Lauterbach (20 May 1663, Ulm - 20 April 1694, Wolfenbüttel) was a German mathematician, architect and master builder at the Court in Braunschweig, from 1688 until his death.

Life and work
His father, Johann (1640–1719), was a shoemaker and guild master. His half-brother, from his father's second marriage, was the cartographer, . After grammar school, he studied theology at the University of Tübingen, then studied mathematics at the University of Jena.

In 1687, Anthony Ulrich, Duke of Brunswick-Wolfenbüttel, assigned him to the Rudolph-Antoniana, a Ritterakademie in Wolfenbüttel, where he taught mathematics and architecture. Two years later, he was appointed Master Builder, in charge of a new princely Building Authority, assisted by Hermann Korb. In 1692, he became the Fortress Engineer and proceeded to expand the city's fortifications.

He died in 1694, following a long illness, aged only thirty. Korb succeeded him as Master Builder and  took his place at the Ritterakademie.

His largest project was the initial draft for the Schloss Salzdahlum. Although monumental in appearance, much of it was actually made of timber and wood panels. During the Napoleonic Wars, it fell into neglect and was demolished in 1813. From 1688 to 1692, he worked on a major expansion of the Schloss Wolfenbüttel.

His treatise, Compendium Architecturae Civilis Harmonicae Antiquae et Novae, was published posthumously in Amsterdam in 1698.

Sources 
 Elmar Arnhold: "Lauterbach, Johann Balthasar, Prof." In: Horst-Rüdiger Jarck, Dieter Lent (Eds.): Braunschweigisches Biographisches Lexikon – 8. bis 18. Jahrhundert. Appelhans Verlag, Braunschweig 2006, pg.430.
 Hans-Henning Grote: Johann Balthasar Lauterbach (1663–1694), Professor für Mathematik, Landbaumeister und Ingenieur am Wolfenbütteler Fürstenhof. Wolfenbüttel 1995, .
 Museum im Schloss Wolfenbüttel und Fachgebiet Baugeschichte TU Braunschweig, Hermann Korb (1656–1735) und seine Zeit – Barockes Bauen im Fürstentum Braunschweig-Wolfenbüttel. Braunschweig 2006, .

External links 
 
 

1663 births
1694 deaths
17th-century German architects
University of Tübingen alumni
University of Jena alumni
People from Ulm